The 2014 New Brunswick general election was held on September 22, 2014, to elect 49 members to the 58th New Brunswick Legislative Assembly, the governing house of the province of New Brunswick, Canada.

The 2013 redistribution reduced the size of the legislature from 55 seats to 49.

The New Brunswick Liberal Association, led by Brian Gallant, won a majority government, defeating Incumbent Premier David Alward's Progressive Conservatives, which became the second single-term government in New Brunswick's history. The New Democratic Party, led by Dominic Cardy won the highest support in its history, though failed to win any seats. As a result of these losses, both Alward and Cardy resigned as leaders of their respective parties. The Green Party of New Brunswick improved on its results from the previous election, with party leader David Coon winning the party's first seat, and becoming only the second Green politician (after British Columbia MLA Andrew J. Weaver) elected to a provincial legislature.

Fracking was a major issue in the election as a whole.  Most commentators described the election as a referendum on it.

Polling in the weeks leading up to the campaign gave the Liberals a wide lead over the governing Progressive Conservatives. Some commentators openly speculated about whether the Liberals were on track to repeat the 1987 provincial election, when they won every seat in the Legislative Assembly. As the campaign progressed, however, the gap in popular support between the two parties narrowed significantly.  Some attributed this in part to a television interview with CBC New Brunswick anchor Harry Forestell in which Gallant gave inaccurate numbers relating to his proposal for a tax increase on the province's wealthiest residents. In the final poll of the campaign, the Liberals and the Progressive Conservatives were tied at 40 per cent support each.

Timeline
 September 27, 2010 – The Progressive Conservatives under David Alward win 42 of 55 seats. The Liberals are reduced to 13 seats and Shawn Graham announces that he will step down as leader.
 October 25, 2010 – NDP leader Roger Duguay resigns. He was replaced by interim leader Jesse Travis.
 November 9, 2010 – Liberal leader Shawn Graham resigns. He was replaced on an interim basis by Victor Boudreau and was permanently replaced by Brian Gallant in late 2012.
 March 2, 2011 – Dominic Cardy is acclaimed as the new leader of the NDP.
 September 12, 2011 – Green leader Jack Macdougall resigns. He was replaced by interim leader Greta Doucet.
 May 16, 2012 – Resignation of Margaret-Ann Blaney as MLA of Rothesay.
 June 25, 2012 – Ted Flemming is elected MLA for Rothesay, following the resignation of Margaret-Ann Blaney.
 September 20, 2012 - Jim Parrott is expelled from the PC caucus after making statements questioning linguistic duality in the healthcare system.
 September 22, 2012 - David Coon is elected new leader of the Green Party.
 October 27, 2012 - Brian Gallant is elected leader of the New Brunswick Liberal Party.
 March 11, 2013 - Shawn Graham resigns as member for Kent.
 April 15, 2013 – Brian Gallant is elected MLA for Kent, following the resignation of Shawn Graham.
 June 6, 2013 - New electoral districts are finalized and will take effect at this election.
 April 30, 2014 - Jim Parrott rejoins PC caucus.
 June 27, 2014 - PC MLA Bev Harrison announces he will seek re-election as a New Democrat, he leaves the PC caucus to sit as an independent.
 August 18, 2014 - Premier Alward meets with Lieutenant-Governor Graydon Nicholas who grants the premier's request to dissolve the legislature effective August 21, 2014 for a general election to be held September 22, 2014.
 August 21, 2014 - New Brunswick legislature dissolved by the lieutenant-governor.
 September 22, 2014 - general election.

Results

|- style="background:#ccc;"
!rowspan="2" colspan="2"|Party
!rowspan="2"|Party leader
!rowspan="2"|# ofcandidates
!colspan="4"|Seats
!colspan="3"|Popular vote
|- style="background:#ccc;"
| style="text-align:center;"|2010
| style="text-align:center;"|Dissolution
| style="text-align:center;"|Elected
| style="text-align:center;"|Change
| style="text-align:center;"|#
| style="text-align:center;"|%
| style="text-align:center;"|Change

|align=left|Brian Gallant
|align="right"|49
|align="right"|13
|align="right"|13
|align="right"|27
|align="right"|+14
|align="right"|158,848
|align="right"|42.72%
|align="right"|+8.30pp

|align=left|David Alward
|align="right"|49
|align="right"|42
|align="right"|41
|align="right"|21
|align="right"|-20
|align="right"|128,801
|align="right"|34.64%
|align="right"|-14.20pp

|align=left|David Coon
|align="right"|46
|align="right"|0
|align="right"|0
|align="right"|1
|align="right"|+1
|align="right"|24,582
|align="right"|6.61%
|align="right"|+2.07pp

|align=left|Dominic Cardy
|align="right"|49
|align="right"|0
|align="right"|0
|align="right"|0
|align="right"|±0
|align="right"|48,257
|align="right"|12.98%
|align="right"|+2.57pp

|align=left|Kris Austin
|align="right"|18
|align="right"|0
|align="right"|0
|align="right"|0
|align="right"|±0
|align="right"|7,964
|align="right"|2.14%
|align="right"|+0.97pp

| style="text-align:left;" colspan="2"|Independent
|align="right"|9
|align="right"|0
|align="right"|1
|align="right"|0
|align="right"|-1
|align="right"|3,293
|align="right"|0.89%
|align="right"|+0.28pp
|-
| style="text-align:left;" colspan="3"|Total
|align="right"|220
|align="right"|55
| style="text-align:right;"|55
| style="text-align:right;"|49
| style="text-align:right;"|-6
| style="text-align:right;"|371,819
|colspan="2"|100%
|-
|}

Tabulator problem and manual recount demand
The election marked the first time that the province used electronic vote tabulation machines from Dominion Voting in a provincial election. They had previously been used in New Brunswick municipal elections. On election night, the machines displayed vote totals which were verified by Elections New Brunswick officials and entered into a province-wide database for the media. By 11:45 PM, these unverified numbers were to have been replaced by totally machine-reported numbers from the tabulators themselves with no human interventions or errors possible to distort results. It was "a program processing the initial results that had a glitch", not the tabulators themselves, according to officials.

Elections New Brunswick grew uncomfortable with the human involvement and influence of the unevenly tabulated results. It brought the results reporting to a standstill as counts were reverified by hand before further resignations or concessions were triggered.

At 10:45 p.m. Atlantic time, Elections New Brunswick officially suspended the results reporting count, with 17 ridings still undeclared, while it investigated the delay. It called for over sixty tabulator count devices to be brought to central locations for verification without relying on the reporting program. At no time was there an allegation of fraud by any party or public official.

As a result of the controversy, both the Progressive Conservatives and the People's Alliance Party called for a hand count of all ballots, with the former refusing to concede the election until the following day. Michael Quinn, the province's chief electoral officer determined no total recount was necessary. Recounts were held in 7 of 49 ridings and the results were upheld with variations of no more than 1 vote per candidate per riding.

Results by region

Results by place

Opinion polls

Retiring incumbents
The following sitting members of the legislative assembly (MLAs) had announced that they would not re-offer at this election:

Progressive Conservatives
John Betts, MLA for Moncton Crescent (1999–2014)
Jack Carr, MLA for New Maryland-Sunbury West (2008–2014)
Greg Davis, MLA for Campbellton-Restigouche Centre (2010–2014)
Dale Graham, MLA for Carleton (1995–2014) and Carleton North (1993–1995)
Wes McLean, MLA for Victoria-Tobique (2010–2014)
Wayne Steeves, MLA for Albert (1999–2014)
Glen Tait, MLA for Saint John East (2010–2014)

Liberals
Roland Haché, MLA for Nigadoo-Chaleur (1999–2014)

Candidates

New boundaries were in effect as a result of an electoral redistribution replacing the districts used in the 2006 and 2010 elections. Candidates had to file their nomination papers by September 2, 2014 to appear on the ballot.

Legend
bold denotes cabinet minister or party leader
italics denotes a potential candidate who has not received his/her party's nomination
† denotes an incumbent who is not running for re-election
* denotes an incumbent seeking re-election in a new district

Northern

|-
| style="background:whitesmoke;"|Restigouche West
|
|Martine Coulombe*1,71020.08%
||
|Gilles LePage4,94058.02%
|
|Gilles Cyr3514.12%
|
|—
|
|Charles Thériault (Independent)1,51417.78%
| colspan="2"  style="text-align:center; background:whitesmoke;"|new district
|-
| rowspan="3" style="background:whitesmoke;"|Campbellton-Dalhousie
|rowspan=3|
|rowspan=3|Joseph Elias1,87924.27%
|rowspan=3 |
|rowspan=3|Donald Arseneault4,82062.25%
|rowspan=3|
|rowspan=3|Jamie O'Rourke7629.84%
|rowspan=3|
|rowspan=3|Heather Wood2823.64%
|rowspan=3|
|rowspan=3|
||
|Donald Arseneault
|-
| colspan="2"  style="background:whitesmoke; text-align:center;"|merged district
|-
||
|Greg Davis†
|-
| style="background:whitesmoke;"|Restigouche-Chaleur
|
|Gilberte Boudreau1,12014.84%
||
|Daniel Guitard4,06953.92%
|
|Ray Godin2,19829.12%
|
|Mario Comeau1602.12%
|
|
||
|Roland Haché†
|-
| style="background:whitesmoke;"|Bathurst West-Beresford
|
|Anne Bard-Lavigne1,77825.54%
||
|Brian Kenny*4,36762.74%
|
|Etienne Arseneau5648.10%
|
|Catherine Doucet2523.62%
|
|
| colspan="2"  style="text-align:center; background:whitesmoke;"|new district
|-
| style="background:whitesmoke;"|Bathurst East-Nepisiguit-Saint-Isidore
|
|Ryan Riordon*1,89426.31%
||
|Denis Landry*4,43161.56%
|
|Benjamin Kalenda5597.77%
|
|Gerry Aubie3144.36%
|
|
| colspan="2"  style="text-align:center; background:whitesmoke;"|new district
|-
| style="background:whitesmoke;"|Caraquet
|
|Suzanne Morais-Vienneau1,81421.86%
||
|Hédard Albert4,71656.82%
|
|Mathieu Chayer1,57919.02%
|
|Sophie Chiasson-Gould1912.30%
|
|
||
|Hédard Albert
|-
| style="background:whitesmoke;"|Shippagan-Lamèque-Miscou
|
|Paul Robichaud3,97045.60%
||
|Wilfred Roussel4,01446.10%
|
|Juliette Paulin4975.71%
|
|Tony Mallet2262.60%
|
|
||
|Paul Robichaud
|-
| style="background:whitesmoke;"|Tracadie-Sheila
|
|Claude Landry2,19523.97%
||
|Serge Rousselle5,91664.61%
|
|François Rousselle8619.40%
|
|Nancy Benoit1211.32%
|
|Donald Thomas (Independent)640.70%
||
|Claude Landry
|}

Miramichi

|-
| style="background:whitesmoke;"|Miramichi Bay-Neguac
|
|Serge Robichaud3,30738.76%
||
|Lisa Harris4,19949.22%
|
|Curtis Bartibogue7859.20%
|
|Filip Vanicek2402.81%
|
|
||
|Serge Robichaud
|-
| rowspan="3" style="background:whitesmoke;"|Miramichi
|rowspan=3|
|rowspan=3|Robert Trevors2,74334.51%
|rowspan=3 |
|rowspan=3|Bill Fraser3,97450.00%
|rowspan=3|
|rowspan=3|Roger Vautour3284.13%
|rowspan=3|
|rowspan=3|Patty Deitch3073.86%
|rowspan=3|
|rowspan=3|Michael "Tanker" Malley (Independent)5967.50%
||
|Bill Fraser
|-
| colspan="2"  style="background:whitesmoke; text-align:center;"|merged district
|-
||
|Robert Trevors
|-
| style="background:whitesmoke;"|Southwest Miramichi-Bay du Vin
||
|Jake Stewart3,83747.62%
|
|Norma Smith2,95136.63%
|
|Douglas Mullin3614.48%
|
|Kevin Matthews2142.66%
|
|Wes Gullison (PANB)6948.61%
||
|Jake Stewart
|}

Southeastern

|-
| style="background:whitesmoke;"|Kent North
|
|Nancy Blanchard1,55916.60%
||
|Bertrand LeBlanc4,69950.02%
|
|Allan Marsh1,29413.77%
|
|Rébeka Frazer-Chiasson1,70718.17%
|
|Raven-Chanelle Arsenault-Augustine (PANB)1351.44%
||
|Bertrand LeBlanc
|-
| rowspan="3" style="background:whitesmoke;"|Kent South
|rowspan=3|
|rowspan=3|Claude Williams3,21633.75%
|rowspan=3 |
|rowspan=3|Benoît Bourque4,63748.66%
|rowspan=3|
|rowspan=3|Paul Musgrave5355.61%
|rowspan=3|
|rowspan=3|Tina Beers95310.00%
|rowspan=3|
|rowspan=3|Joël MacIntosh (PANB)1881.97%
||
|Brian Gallant
|-
| colspan="2"  style="background:whitesmoke; text-align:center;"|merged district
|-
||
|Claude Williams
|-
| style="background:whitesmoke;"|Shediac Bay-Dieppe
|
|Dolorès Poirier1,67819.15%
||
|Brian Gallant*5,66164.61%
|
|Agathe Lapointe8039.16%
|
|Stephanie Matthews6207.08%
|
|
| colspan="2"  style="text-align:center; background:whitesmoke;"|new district
|-
| style="background:whitesmoke;"|Shediac-Beaubassin-Cap-Pelé
|
|Carmel Brun1,71818.81%
||
|Victor Boudreau5,49660.18%
|
|Bernice Boudreau1,17512.87%
|
|Charles Thibodeau7438.14%
|
|
||
|Victor Boudreau
|-
| style="background:whitesmoke;"|Memramcook-Tantramar
|
|Mike Olscamp2,03726.45%
||
|Bernard LeBlanc*3,51545.64%
|
|Hélène Boudreau97212.62%
|
|Megan Mitton1,17815.29%
|
|
||
|Mike Olscamp
|-
| style="background:whitesmoke;"|Dieppe
|
|Normand Léger1,36018.44%
||
|Roger Melanson4,86665.97%
|
|Sandy Harquail7369.98%
|
|Françoise Aubin4145.61%
|
|
||
|Roger Melanson
|-
| style="background:whitesmoke;"|Moncton East
|
|Jane Mitton-MacLean2,52133.01%
||
|Monique LeBlanc3,44345.09%
|
|Roy MacMullin1,10514.47%
|
|Matthew Clark5677.43%
|
|
| colspan="2"  style="text-align:center; background:whitesmoke;"|new district
|-
| style="background:whitesmoke;"|Moncton Centre
|
|Marie-Claude Blais*1,58925.21%
||
|Chris Collins*3,33952.98%
|
|Luc Leblanc86613.74%
|
|Jeffrey McCluskey5088.06%
|
|
| colspan="2"  style="text-align:center; background:whitesmoke;"|new district
|-
| style="background:whitesmoke;"|Moncton South
|
|Sue Stultz2,24734.91%
||
|Cathy Rogers2,90345.10%
|
|Elisabeth French75711.76%
|
|Rish McGlynn5308.23%
|
|
||
|Sue Stultz
|-
| style="background:whitesmoke;"|Moncton Northwest
||
|Ernie Steeves3,01242.15%
|
|Brian Hicks2,77338.80%
|
|Jason Purdy78310.96%
|
|Mike Milligan4366.10%
|
|Carl Bainbridge (PANB)1421.99%
||
|John Betts†
|-
| style="background:whitesmoke;"|Moncton Southwest
||
|Sherry Wilson*2,52338.80%
|
|Tyson Milner2,27434.97%
|
|Charles Doucet1,12917.36%
|
|Mathieu LaPlante3926.03%
|
|Lucy Goguen (PANB)1842.83%
|
| colspan="2"  style="text-align:center; background:whitesmoke;"|new district
|-
| style="background:whitesmoke;"|Riverview
||
|Bruce Fitch3,75152.73%
|
|Tammy Rampersaud2,09729.48%
|
|Danie Pitre72310.16%
|
|Linda Hardwick5427.62%
|
|
||
|Bruce Fitch
|-
| style="background:whitesmoke;"|Albert
||
|Brian Keirstead3,16340.78%
|
|Terry Keating2,19028.24%
|
|Kelly-Sue O'Connor88011.35%
|
|Ira Wilbur92911.98%
|
|Bill Brewer (PANB)5947.66%
||
|Wayne Steeves†
|-
| style="background:whitesmoke;"|Gagetown-Petitcodiac
||
|Ross Wetmore*3,35244.47%
|
|Barak Stevens2,49933.15%
|
|Anthony Crandall97812.97%
|
|Fred Harrison7099.41%
|
|
| colspan="2"  style="text-align:center; background:whitesmoke;"|new district
|}

Southern

|-
| style="background:whitesmoke;"|Sussex-Fundy-St. Martins
||
|Bruce Northrup3,67749.86%
|
|Heike MacGregor1,71023.19%
|
|Billy Carter6528.84%
|
|Stephanie Coburn5707.73%
|
|LeRoy Armstrong (PANB)76610.39%
||
|Bruce Northrup
|-
| style="background:whitesmoke;"|Hampton
||
|Gary Crossman2,67938.74%
|
|John Cairns1,61823.40%
|
|Bev Harrison*1,79625.97%
|
|John Sabine5548.01%
|
|Joan K. Seeley (PANB)2693.89%
| colspan="2"  style="text-align:center; background:whitesmoke;"|new district
|-
| style="background:whitesmoke;"|Quispamsis
||
|Blaine Higgs3,88451.35%
|
|Mary Schryer2,39031.60%
|
|Angela-Jo Griffin93812.40%
|
|Patrick Kemp2383.15%
|
|Brandon Gardner (PANB)1141.51%
||
|Blaine Higgs
|-
| style="background:whitesmoke;"|Rothesay
||
|Ted Flemming3,03945.24%
|
|Stephanie Tomilson1,83827.36%
|
|John Wilcox1,55923.21%
|
|Ann McAllister2824.20%
|
|
||
|Ted Flemming
|-
| rowspan="3" style="background:whitesmoke;"|Saint John East
|rowspan=3|
|rowspan=3|Glen Savoie2,32336.88%
|rowspan=3 |
|rowspan=3|Gary Keating2,33237.02%
|rowspan=3|
|rowspan=3|Phil Comeau1,16718.53%
|rowspan=3|
|rowspan=3|Sharon Murphy3535.60%
|rowspan=3|
|rowspan=3|Jason Inness (PANB)1241.97%
||
|Glen Savoie
|-
| colspan="2"  style="text-align:center; background:whitesmoke;"|merged district
|-
||
|Glen Tait†
|-
| style="background:whitesmoke;"|Portland-Simonds
||
|Trevor Holder2,78248.90%
|
|Michael Butler1,90533.49%
|
|Tony Sekulich74313.06%
|
|Sheila Croteau2594.55%
|
|
||
|Trevor Holder
|-
| style="background:whitesmoke;"|Saint John Harbour
|
|Carl Killen1,61530.84%
||
|Ed Doherty1,68632.19%
|
|Gary Stackhouse1,12021.39%
|
|Wayne Dryer70113.39%
|
|Arthur Watson (PANB)1152.20%
||
|Carl Killen
|-
| style="background:whitesmoke;"|Saint John Lancaster
||
|Dorothy Shephard2,61939.18%
|
|Peter McGuire2,16232.35%
|
|Abel LeBlanc1,53522.97%
|
|Ashley Durdle2834.23%
|
|Mary Ellen Carpenter (Independent)851.27%
||
|Dorothy Shephard
|-
| style="background:whitesmoke;"|Kings Centre
||
|Bill Oliver2,43135.66%
|
|Shannon Merrifield2,11030.95%
|
|Daniel Anderson1,64224.09%
|
|Mark Connell3114.56%
|
|Colby Fraser (Independent)3234.74%
| colspan="2"  style="text-align:center; background:whitesmoke;"|new district
|-
| style="background:whitesmoke;"|Fundy-The Isles-Saint John West
|
|Jim Parrott*1,82825.39%
||
|Rick Doucet4,49862.47%
|
|Terry James5587.75%
|
|Krysta Oland3164.39%
|
|
||
|Rick Doucet
|-
| style="background:whitesmoke;"|Charlotte-Campobello
|
|Curtis Malloch2,98239.19%
||
|John Ames3,17641.73%
|
|June Greenlaw5156.77%
|
|Derek Simon4535.95%
|
|Joyce Wright (PANB)4846.36%
||
|Curtis Malloch
|}

Capital Region

|-
| rowspan="3" style="background:whitesmoke;"|Oromocto-Lincoln
|rowspan=3 |
|rowspan=3|Jody Carr2,82741.97%
|rowspan=3|
|rowspan=3|Trisha Hoyt2,35434.95%
|rowspan=3|
|rowspan=3|Amanda Diggins85712.72%
|rowspan=3|
|rowspan=3|Jean Louis Deveau3795.63%
|rowspan=3|
|rowspan=3|Jeff Langille (PANB)3184.72%
||
|Jody Carr
|-
| colspan="2"  style="background:whitesmoke; text-align:center;"|merged district
|-
||
|Craig Leonard
|-
| rowspan="3" style="background:whitesmoke;"|Fredericton-Grand Lake
|rowspan=3 |
|rowspan=3|Pam Lynch2,40328.79%
|rowspan=3|
|rowspan=3|Sheri Shannon2,33027.91%
|rowspan=3|
|rowspan=3|Bronwen Mosher87910.53%
|rowspan=3|
|rowspan=3|Dan Weston3584.29%
|rowspan=3|
|rowspan=3|Kris Austin(PANB)2,37728.48%
||
|Pam Lynch
|-
| colspan="2"  style="background:whitesmoke; text-align:center;"|merged district
|-
||
|Ross Wetmore
|-
| style="background:whitesmoke;"|New Maryland-Sunbury
||
|Jeff Carr3,39140.95%
|
|Michael Pearson2,59531.34%
|
|Aimee Foreman1,78721.58%
|
|Kelsey Adams5086.13%
|
|
||
|Jack Carr†
|-
| style="background:whitesmoke;"|Fredericton South
|
|Craig Leonard*1,93826.17%
|
|Roy Wiggins1,60121.62%
|
|Kelly Lamrock1,46519.78%
||
|David Coon2,27230.68%
|
|Courtney Mills (Independent)1301.76%
| colspan="2"  style="text-align:center; background:whitesmoke;"|new district
|-
| style="background:whitesmoke;"|Fredericton North
|
|Troy Lifford*2,44531.73%
||
|Stephen Horsman2,58933.60%
|
|Brian Duplessis1,56020.25%
|
|Madeleine Berrevoets79110.27%
|
|Patricia Wilkins (PANB)3204.15%
| colspan="2"  style="text-align:center; background:whitesmoke;"|new district
|-
| style="background:whitesmoke;"|Fredericton-York
||
|Kirk MacDonald*2,88635.42%
|
|Randy McKeen2,36529.03%
|
|Sharon Scott-Levesque1,69520.80%
|
|Dorothy Diamond5837.16%
|
|Rick Wilkins (PANB)3794.65%Gerald Bourque (Independent)2402.95%
| colspan="2"  style="text-align:center; background:whitesmoke;"|new district
|-
| rowspan="3" style="background:whitesmoke;"|Fredericton West-Hanwell
|rowspan=3 |
|rowspan=3|Brian Macdonald2,97135.21%
|rowspan=3|
|rowspan=3|Bernadine Gibson2,38428.25%
|rowspan=3|
|rowspan=3|Dominic Cardy2,50229.65%
|rowspan=3|
|rowspan=3|Gayla MacIntosh5826.90%
|rowspan=3|
|rowspan=3|
||
|Brian Macdonald
|-
| colspan="2"  style="background:whitesmoke; text-align:center;"|merged district
|-
||
|Carl Urquhart
|-
| style="background:whitesmoke;"|Carleton-York
||
|Carl Urquhart*3,66246.53%
|
|Ashley Cummings2,20327.99%
|
|Jacob Elsinga81610.37%
|
|Terry Wishart6027.65%
|
|David Graham (PANB)5877.46%
| colspan="2"  style="text-align:center; background:whitesmoke;"|new district
|}

Upper River Valley

|-
| style="background:whitesmoke;"|Carleton
||
|David Alward*4,06156.77%
|
|Thomas Reid1,58822.20%
|
|Jeremiah Clark5808.11%
|
|Andrew Clark75010.49%
|
|Steven Love (PANB)1742.43%
| colspan="2"  style="text-align:center; background:whitesmoke;"|new district
|-
| rowspan="3" style="background:whitesmoke;"|Carleton-Victoria
|rowspan=3|
|rowspan=3|Colin Lockhart3,04939.76%
|rowspan=3 |
|rowspan=3|Andrew Harvey3,13140.83%
|rowspan=3|
|rowspan=3|Joe Gee6838.91%
|rowspan=3|
|rowspan=3|Garth Farquhar4646.05%
|rowspan=3|
|rowspan=3|Carter Edgar (Independent)2162.82%Terry Ritchie (Independent)1251.63%
||
|Dale Graham†
|-
|colspan="2" style="text-align:center; background:whitesmoke;"|merged district
|-
||
|Wes McLean†
|-
| style="background:whitesmoke;"|Victoria-la-Vallée
|
|Danny Soucy3,05638.20%
||
|Chuck Chiasson3,96949.62%
|
|Joe Berube5466.83%
|
|Daniel Zolondek4285.35%
|
|
||
|Danny Soucy
|-
| style="background:whitesmoke;"|Edmundston-Madawaska Centre
||
|Madeleine Dubé3,66648.16%
|
|Michel LeBlond3,42344.97%
|
|Alain Martel5236.87%
|
|
|
|
||
|Madeleine Dubé
|-
| style="background:whitesmoke;"|Madawaska-les-Lacs-Edmundston
|
|Yvon Bonenfant2,61635.92%
||
|Francine Landry4,10656.39%
|
|Widler Jules5607.69%
|
|
|
|
||
|Yvon Bonenfant
|}

Notes

References

Further reading

 

Elections in New Brunswick
New Brunswick general election
General election
New Brunswick general election